Dave Chappelle: Live in Real Life (originally titled Dave Chappelle: This Time This Place and advertised as Untitled Dave Chappelle Documentary) is a documentary film directed by Steven Bognar and Julia Reichert. The film details Dave Chappelle's 2020 comedy shows and musical concerts he put on in Yellow Springs, Ohio during the COVID-19 pandemic in the United States and the 2020 George Floyd protests.

Background 
Following closures of comedy clubs and venues due to the COVID-19 pandemic and the murder of George Floyd, Dave Chappelle began hosting outdoor comedy and music shows in a cornfield in his home of Yellow Springs, Ohio. Chappelle created a COVID-19 bubble to protect artists via testing. The bubble suffered a few COVID-19 exposures. Filmmakers Steven Bognar and Julia Reichert, directors of the documentary American Factory, happen to be Chappelle's neighbours and were asked to direct the film.

Release 
The film was premiered at Tribeca Film Festival on June 19, 2021 at Radio City Music Hall.

Following controversy over jokes made in Chappelle's October 2021 Netflix special The Closer, distributors were not interested in the film and film festivals "uninvited" the film from being screened. Chappelle decided to take the film on tour to be shown in 10 arenas in cities across the United States and Canada and will have a limited theatrical run beginning November 19, 2021.

Reception 
Chappelle asked critics not to review the film.

In a positive review, Peter Debruge of Variety called the film "an impressive account of how the comedian found a way to host live stand-up shows during the jittery first summer of the COVID-19 pandemic, directed by Oscar-winning American Factory duo Julia Reichert and Steven Bognar".

The film has not yet been released to the general public.

References

External links
 

2021 documentary films
2021 films
American documentary films
2021 comedy films
Concert films
2020s English-language films
2020s American films
Dave Chappelle